Group of Ukrainian military specialists in Eritrea is a contingent of military advisers to the Armed Forces of Ukraine and mercenaries to the Eritrean Defence Forces. Ukrainian servicemen provided significant assistance to the country during the Ethiopian-Eritrean War. It is noteworthy that the opposing side used the services of military specialists from Russia.

Literature 
 Алексей Андреев. АФРИКАНСКИЙ РОГ: ЗАТИШЬЕ ПЕРЕД БУРЕЙ // Независимая газета : газета. — 29 марта 2000.
 Александр Пинчук. Командировка в Африку // Красная звезда : газета. — 11 апреля 2009.
 Михаил Жирохов. Война в воздухе на Африканском Роге // Уголок неба : авиационная энциклопедия. — 2004.

Military of Eritrea
Military units and formations of Ukraine
Military advisory groups
Eritrean–Ethiopian border conflict